Abdul Jabar Carter is an American college football outside linebacker for the Penn State Nittany Lions.

Early life and high school career
Carter grew up in Philadelphia, Pennsylvania and attended La Salle College High School in Wyndmoor, Pennsylvania. As a senior, he made 78 tackles with 10 tackles for loss. Carter was rated a four-star recruit and committed to play college football at Penn State over offers from South Carolina and Ole Miss. Following the end of his senior season, he played in the Big 33 Football Classic.

College career
Carter enrolled at Penn State in June 2022 shortly after graduating high school. He was ejected for targeting in his collegiate debut against Purdue. Carter served as a key reserve at linebacker at the beginning of his freshman season. He made his first career start in Penn State's seventh game of the season against Minnesota.

References

External links
Penn State Nittany Lions bio

Living people
Players of American football from Pennsylvania
American football linebackers
Penn State Nittany Lions football players
Year of birth missing (living people)